Iveria may refer to:

Places
 Radisson Blu Iveria Hotel, Tbilisi, a hotel Georgia
 Iveria, an archaic name for the country of Georgia

Other uses
 Iverian or Mingrelian language, spoken in Western Georgia
 FC Iveria Khashuri, a Georgian football club
 VIA Iveria, a Georgian music group from the 1970s–1980s
 Iveria (newspaper), a newspaper edited (1877–1905) by Ilia Chavchavadze

See also
 Iberia (disambiguation)